Anthony Brandenburg (born February 24, 1963) is an American musician best known as the lead singer for the punk rock band the Adolescents. He has used the pseudonyms Tony Cadena, Tony Montana, and Tony Adolescent, and since 1992 has most consistently credited himself as Tony Reflex. Active in music since 1980, he has fronted several bands in addition to the Adolescents—including the Abandoned, the Flower Leperds, ADZ, and Sister Goddamn—and has performed on over 20 studio albums.

At age 16, Brandenburg founded the Adolescents in Fullerton, California with fellow punk musicians Steve Soto and Frank Agnew. Under the name Tony Cadena, he sang on the band's debut album Adolescents and the Welcome to Reality EP (both 1981), but the group disbanded shortly thereafter. Changing his stage name to Tony Montana, he started a new group, the Abandoned, which released one studio album. The Adolescents reunited, but Brandenburg left the band after 1987's Brats in Battalions, and they recorded one album without him before breaking up again. Brandenburg joined the Flower Leperds, replacing original singer Marc Olson, and released three studio albums with them between 1988 and 1990, sometimes calling himself Tony Adolescent. His next group, Sister Goddamn, issued albums in 1992 and 1995. Meanwhile, a brief Adolescents reunion in 1989 reconnected him with former bandmates Rikk Agnew and Casey Royer, and the three started a new group, ADZ, with Brandenburg now using the name Tony Reflex. Agnew and Royer left following the group's 1992 debut album, but Brandenburg kept ADZ going for the next thirteen years with other members and issued three more studio albums. The Adolescents reunited again in 2001 and have remained active, touring and releasing five studio albums with lineups anchored by Brandenburg and founding bassist Steve Soto. Brandenburg has also collaborated with the bands White Flag and Sun & Sail Club for records on which he has served as their singer.

Outside of bands, Brandenburg has pursued a career in teaching and has been a vocal advocate for the rights of people with autism and Asperger's Syndrome, as well as for music and fine arts in education. He has also written and performed poetry, and has written for music magazines including Flipside and Maximumrocknroll.

Career
Tony's musical career started with a band he formed in junior high school, in which he played Tupperware, pots and pans, an octagon organ, and also wrote the lyrics. The band practiced at his home—specifically in the garage—but split up soon after forming. In 1979, then 16-year-old Tony formed The Adolescents with Steve Soto while they talked at the end of an Agent Orange concert in Santa Ana, California. The band released a track on Rodney Bigenheimer's "Rodney on the Roq" in 1980 which led to the release of their self-titled debut album The Adolescents and an EP in 1981, and  disbanded later that year. Cadena then moved on to bands such as The Abandoned and God Riots 73. 

In 1986, he found himself playing in The Adolescents again, assuming the stage name "Tony Montana" when the band reformed. After leaving The Adolescents in 1987, Tony joined the Flower Leperds. After a reunion in 1989, Tony went on to start another band in the Adolescents tradition called ADZ, in which he currently remains. Tony has also done occasional guest vocal spots with Los Angeles veterans White Flag and Fu Manchu,  France's Burning Heads, as well as with desert rockers Half Astro.

In 2001, Tony regrouped with the other original members of The Adolescents for a reunion tour in honor of the 20th anniversary of their self-titled album. They continue to tour worldwide and released a studio album in 2005 titled OC Confidential. Since 2007, the Adolescents had been working on their next studio album, The Fastest Kid Alive which was eventually released in 2011, as well as contributions for upcoming tributes to the Runaways, and the Seeds. With the Adolescents, he has received Best Punk Band by the OC Music Awards in 2010 and 2012, In 2003 the Adolescents were chosen as the greatest all time band from Orange County by the OC Weekly. In 2012 he began work on a four song EP with the Adolescents titled "American Dogs in Europe" for the German label  Concrete Jungle.

Aside from his musical pursuits, Tony has a career in teaching, and for a period taught special education. He is a vocal advocate for the rights of people with autism and Asperger's Syndrome, as well as for music and fine arts in education.  He has done numerous benefits to raise money for these interest groups, including benefit shows for the Silverlake Music Conservatory, and submitting a track for "Brats on the Beat" for St. Jude Children's Research Hospital. 

In his spare time, Tony writes poetry that has been described as being "hilarious or heartbreaking"; a notable poetry reading was at the Parlour Club in Santa Monica on April 21, 2002. Tony was invited to read by poet Lydia Lunch and photographer/artist Steve Martinez. His poetry, most of which is unpublished, spans some 30+ years. 

Tony has written for various magazines, most notably Flipside, "Maximum Rock and Roll", and Loud, Fast, Rules. His interviews with bands Manic Hispanic, Electric Frankenstein, and the Lee Harvey Oswald Band are among the earliest print interviews that exist for those bands. He has also written numerous liner notes for recorded and printed works, including liner notes for the Adolescents releases "Live 1981 and 1986" and "Naughty Women in Black Sweaters", Abandoned "LAMF", "Gabba Gabba Hey" (which he co-produced), "Blitzkrieg Over You", and "Beach Blvd.", as well written pieces in print releases by Bruce Duff, photographer Edward Colver, film maker Dave Markey, and photography in the poster/art book  for New Jersey monster rockers Electric Frankenstein.

Discography

Filmography
American Hardcore (2006) as himself
The Other F Word (2011) as himself
Clockwork Orange County (2012) as himself

References

1963 births
Living people
American punk rock musicians
People from Pacifica, California
Adolescents (band) members